The 2014 special election for Florida's 19th congressional district was held on June 24, 2014, following party primary elections which were held on April 22. The election was held to fill the vacancy caused by the resignation of Trey Radel from the United States House of Representatives. Radel resigned on January 27, 2014, two months after he was arrested for possession of cocaine. Curt Clawson was elected as the new U.S. Representative.

Background
On October 29, 2013, Radel was arrested in the District of Columbia for purchasing  of cocaine from an undercover officer. He did not inform House Republicans about the arrest. Less than a month later, Radel pleaded guilty to a misdemeanor count of possession of cocaine and was sentenced to one year of supervised probation. The charge "would have been a felony had it happened in his home state," according to Terry Miller, the Republican chairman in Lee County, Florida.

Radel announced that he would be taking a leave of absence from Congress to undergo addiction rehabilitation and that he would be donating his salary to charity during his absence.  Following his announcement, the Republican Party of Florida and Governor Rick Scott called on Radel to "resign immediately" and "focus his attention on rehabilitation and his family". Radel returned to Congress in January 2014, vowing to continue to serve. The House Ethics Committee began an investigation. On January 27, he decided to announce his resignation, effective that evening. Scott set April 22 as the date for the primary election, and June 24 for the general election.

Republican primary
The News-Press described the Republican primary—the real contest in this heavily Republican district—as "a decidedly negative affair, with hyperbolic accusations and character assassination floated freely in television ads, mailers and news stories bombarding Southwest Florida voters." With "no difference on the issues among the three major candidates", Benacquisto, Clawson and Kreegel all attacked each other, with Benacquisto attacked for being "liberal" and an ex-Democrat; Clawson as an uncaring businessman who laid off workers and drove his company into bankruptcy; and Kreegel as a "win-at-all-costs conniver" who violated election laws. Dreikorn, was considered to have little chance and largely refrained from attacking his fellow candidates, calling for an end to the "political infighting".

In April 2014, Benacquisto, Dreikorn and Kreegel attacked Clawson over his links to convicted child molester Glen Borst, who was a childhood friend of Clawson and whose last known address was a house in Utah that Clawson owned. Clawson dismissed the attacks as "politically driven... that just couldn't be further from the truth" and the mother of Borst's victim asked them to stop, calling the politicization of the issue "disturb[ing] and disgust[ing]". Benacquisto, Dreikorn and Kreegel hosted a press conference on April 9 to demand answers from Clawson, who made an impromptu and surprise appearance. After Clawson made his case, all four candidates pledged to stop attacking each other.

Clawson won the primary with 38% of the vote.

Candidates

Declared
 Lizbeth Benacquisto, state senator
 Curt Clawson, businessman
 Michael Dreikorn, businessman
 Paige Kreegel, former state representative and candidate for the seat in 2012

Declined
 Gary Aubuchon, former state representative and candidate for the seat in 2012
 Chauncey Goss, political consultant, candidate for the seat in 2012 and son of former U.S. Representative Porter Goss
 Connie Mack IV, former U.S. Representative and nominee for the U.S. Senate in 2012
 Gary Price, vice mayor of Naples

Endorsements

Polling

Results

General election

Candidates
 Curt Clawson (Republican), businessman
 April Freeman (Democratic), businesswoman and former Republican political activist
 Ray Netherwood (Libertarian)
 Timothy Rossano (write-in)

References

Florida 2014 19
Florida 2014 19
2014 19 Special
Florida 19 Special
United States House of Representatives 19 Special
United States House of Representatives 2014 19